Dede Dolopei is a Liberian civil servant.

Information
She is the vice-chairperson of the Truth and Reconciliation Commission for Liberia. She has worked in various non-governmental organizations concerning women's rights, peace-building, conflict resolution and psychosocial counseling. She also holds several degrees from the University of Liberia.

References

Sources
 Short biography on TRC of Liberia

Year of birth missing (living people)
Living people
Liberian activists
Liberian women activists
University of Liberia alumni